UFC on ESPN: Santos vs. Hill (also known as UFC on ESPN 40 and UFC Vegas 59) was a mixed martial arts event produced by the Ultimate Fighting Championship that took place on August 6, 2022, at the UFC Apex facility in Enterprise, Nevada, part of the Las Vegas Metropolitan Area, United States.

Background
A light heavyweight bout between former UFC Light Heavyweight title challenger Thiago Santos and Jamahal Hill headlined the event.

The heavyweight and women's flyweight finals of The Ultimate Fighter: Team Peña vs. Team Nunes took place at the event.

Former KSW Women's Flyweight Champion Ariane Lipski and Priscila Cachoeira were expected to meet in a flyweight bout at this event. They were previously scheduled to fight at UFC Fight Night: Błachowicz vs. Jacaré in November 2019, but Cachoeira withdrew after being suspended for the use of a diuretic. At the weigh-ins, Lipski weighed in at 128.5 pounds, two and a half pounds over the flyweight non-title fight limit. The bout was originally expected to proceed at catchweight with Lipski fined 20% of her purse. However, the fight was removed from the card on the day of the event due to Lipski not being medically cleared, and was postponed one week to UFC on ESPN: Vera vs. Cruz.

A featherweight bout between Nate Landwehr and Zubaira Tukhugov was expected to take place at the event. However, Tukhugov pulled out of the fight due to alleged visa issues which restricted his travel and was replaced by David Onama at UFC on ESPN: Vera vs. Cruz a week later.

A welterweight bout between Jason Witt and Josh Quinlan was expected to take place at this event. However, it was pushed back one week to UFC on ESPN: Vera vs. Cruz after Quinlan was pulled for an atypical drug finding: long-term metabolite (or M3 metabolite) of the steroid dehydrochloromethyltestosterone (DHCMT) in his urine sample.

Results

Bonus awards
The following fighters received $50,000 bonuses.
 Fight of the Night: Jamahal Hill vs. Thiago Santos
 Performance of the Night:  Geoff Neal, Mohammed Usman, and Bryan Battle

Aftermath
With ten finishes in ten bouts, this event ties UFC Fight Night: Rockhold vs. Bisping for a 100 percent finish rate for all bouts in a single UFC event.

See also

 List of UFC events
 List of current UFC fighters
 2022 in UFC

References

UFC on ESPN
2022 in mixed martial arts
August 2022 sports events in the United States
2022 in sports in Nevada
Mixed martial arts in Las Vegas
Sports competitions in Las Vegas